Ajo Motorsport is a Finnish Grand Prix motorcycle racing team, currently competing in the Moto2 and Moto3 classes under the name Red Bull KTM Ajo. The team's founder and principal is former racer Aki Ajo. His son, former racer Niklas Ajo, is also involved in the team as crew chief and race engineer in the Moto3 programme.

The team debuted in 2001 and took its first win in 2003. Ajo Motorsport has won eight world championship titles; the 125cc championship with Mike Di Meglio in 2008 and Marc Márquez in 2010, the Moto3 championship in 2012 with Sandro Cortese, 2016 with Brad Binder and 2021 with Pedro Acosta, and the Moto2 championship in 2015 and 2016, both with Johann Zarco, and 2021 with Remy Gardner.

History

The team's debut at a world championship race was at Sachsenring in 2001, where the team entered Mika Kallio as a wildcard rider. The team and Kallio also took part in the competition in Valencia later in the year. The team's bikes were labelled with the Honda brand name, even though the engines were supplied by Ajo. 2002 was the first season in which Ajo was a regular competitor in the World Championship, with Kallio as their main rider. Their best result that season was fifth place in Jerez, and Kallio was named "Rookie of the Year", beating riders such as Andrea Dovizioso and Jorge Lorenzo.

In 2003, the team expanded to two bikes, with Kallio being joined by the Japanese competitor Masao Azuma. Kallio then left the team in August after receiving an offer from KTM. He was replaced by Andrea Ballerini. In Australia, the team achieved a 1–2 victory, with Ballerini in first place and Azuma in second. Ajo attributed a large portion of their success to the combination of wet conditions and Bridgestone tyres, which are optimal for damp weather. For the 2004 season, the team had two new riders in Lukáš Pešek and Danish Robbin Harms. The season was a disappointing one for Ajo, as Pešek crashed repeatedly and as Harms suffered several injuries. Pešek moved to the Derbi team for the next season.

Japanese Tomoyoshi Koyama and French Alexis Masbou were Ajo's riders in the 2005 season. Koyama won the "Rookie of the Year" title, the team's second in four years. His best results were second place in Australia and third in Turkey; in overall standings he held eighth place. The team kept the same riders for the following year but obtained new bikes from Malaguti. Both riders suffered many injuries which affected their season. Masbou was only able to ride eight races and did not score any points. Koyama's best result was sixth in Estoril, and he ended in 15th place in the championship standings. In 2007, the team raced with Derbi bikes, driven by Michael Ranseder and Robert Mureșan. Ranseder finished in the points 13 times, while Mureșan failed to score.

Ajo Motorsport continued with Derbi for the 2008 season, with Mike Di Meglio and Dominique Aegerter as their riders. Di Meglio won four races (France, Catalonia, Germany and Australia) and clinched the world championship in Australia, two races before the end of the season. Aegerter finished eighth twice. Sandro Cortese accompanied Dominique Aegerter in 2009. The team scored several podiums this season but did not manage to win any races. In the 2010 season, Ajo Motorsport fielded Marc Márquez, Sandro Cortese and Adrián Martín. The season was a big success for the team. Márquez scored twelve poles and ten victories, and brought the team its second title in three years.

Grand Prix motorcycle results

By rider

By season

(key) (Races in bold indicate pole position; races in italics indicate fastest lap)

References

External links
 

Motorcycle racing teams
Motorsport in Finland
Red Bull sports teams
Motorcycle racing teams established in 2001
2001 establishments in Finland